PAF Base Chandhar, or Chandhar Airbase, is an Air Force Base located near Chandhar, a town in District Gujranwala in the province of Punjab in Pakistan. The Air Force Base is controlled by Pakistan Air Force.

Facilities

References

Pakistan Air Force bases
Military installations in Punjab, Pakistan